Laura Lynn Handy (born July 25, 1980, in Atlantic City, New Jersey) is an American pair skater. With partner Paul Binnebose, she is the 1999 U.S. senior national bronze medalist and 1999 World Junior silver medalist. Later that year, Binnebose suffered a skull fracture, and he never returned to competitive skating. Handy later competed with Jonathon Hunt and Jeremy Allen. Handy is now a coach.

Programs
With Hunt

With Allen

Results

Singles

Pairs 

With Peterson

With Binnebose

With Hunt

With Allen

References

1980 births
American female pair skaters
Living people
Sportspeople from Atlantic City, New Jersey
World Junior Figure Skating Championships medalists
21st-century American women
20th-century American women